Cream City is the debut album by American funk/soul band Aalon. Released in 1977 and produced by Jerry Goldstein, the album reached number 45 on the R&B albums chart in the US. The group disbanded shortly after the album's release. It was reissued on CD by Thump Records in the mid-1990s, and the album has had a cult following ever since.

Track listing
Cream City - (Aalon Butler, Jerry Goldstein)  3:25
Rock and Roll Gangster - (Aalon Butler)  5:25
Midnight Man - (Aalon Butler)  4:41
Summer Love - (Aalon Butler)  5:01
Steven Baine's Electric Train - (Aalon Butler, Jerry Goldstein)  4:04
Lonely Princess - (Aalon Butler)  5:47
Magic Night - (Aalon Butler, Jerry Goldstein)  7:20
Jungle Desire - (Aalon Butler, Juan Luis Cabaza)  7:27

Personnel
Aalon
Aalon Butler — guitars, lead and backing vocals
Luis Cabaza — keyboards
Luther Rabb — bass
Ron Hammond – drums
Additional personnel
Al Roberts — bass
Alvin Taylor – drums
Barbara Benney, Freddy Pool, Paula Bellamy — backing vocals on "Cream City"

Charts

Singles

References

External links
 Aalon-Cream City at Discogs

1977 debut albums
Arista Records albums
Albums produced by Jerry Goldstein (producer)